Israel Salazar de Luna Freire (born 11 June 1990) is a Brazilian contemporary worship music singer and songwriter.

Biography 
Salazar was born in Rio de Janeiro. Through adolescence in a religious middle Salazar found himself heavily involved with music, and from a local band. Freire became a student of CTMDT, and became a member of Diante do Trono. His first recording was 2009's Tua Visão. Freire gained prominence as the lead singer. In February 2013, Salazar served as arranger and one of the major composers of the album Nada Temerei, Ana Nóbrega, released by Som Livre label.

Discography 
Studio albums
 Jesus (2015)

Live albums
 Avante (2017)

Singles
 "É Natal" (2015)
 "Deus Conosco" (2015)
 "Tua Igreja Canta" (2017)
 "Fé Inabalável" (2019)
 "Move o Sobrenatural" (2019)

External links
 https://twitter.com/israelsalazar/

References

1990 births
Living people
21st-century Brazilian male singers
21st-century Brazilian singers
Brazilian Christian religious leaders
Christian music songwriters
Performers of contemporary worship music
Brazilian gospel singers
Brazilian male singer-songwriters
Musicians from Rio de Janeiro (city)
Brazilian Baptists